This is a timeline of the history of teletext on television in the UK. .

1970s 
 1972
 October – Ceefax is announced by the BBC as a new service providing pages of text on ordinary television screens.
 1973
 No events.
 1974
 23 September – The BBC's teletext service Ceefax goes live with 30 pages of information.
 1975
 No events.
 1976
 World System Teletext is adopted as the common way to broadcast teletext services through Europe with a display format of 24 rows by 40 columns of characters.
 1977
 No events.
 1978
 ITV's teletext service ORACLE launches.
 1979
 No events.

1980s 
 1980
 March – The very first in-vision Ceefax transmissions are broadcast. Three 30-minute transmissions are aired at various points during weekday daytime downtime.
 1981
 No events.
 1982
 1 November – S4C launches and this results in the start of transmissions of its teletext service Sbectel.
 2 November – Channel 4 launches and this results in the start of transmissions of its teletext service 4-Tel. Both Sbectel and 4-Tel are operated in conjunction with ORACLE with the production of 4-Tel outsourced to Intelfax, a company set up especially for the purpose.
 1983
 28 February  – BBC1 begins broadcasting a 30-minute Ceefax slot prior to the start of Breakfast Time. It is called Ceefax AM. It is first mentioned in the Radio Times on 21 March.
 18 March – Channel 4 broadcasts in-vision teletext pages for the first time. Two magazines are shown – 4-Tel on View and Oracle on View – and in fifteen minute bursts which are repeated several times each day prior to the start of each day's transmissions. Teletext pages are only shown on weekdays.
 2 May – From today Ceefax in Vision is broadcast during all daytime downtime although until September BBC2 continues to fully close down for four hours after Play School.
 Ceefax starts to broadcast computer programs, known as telesoftware, for the BBC Micro (a home computer available in the United Kingdom). It broadcasts the pages in the 700s page range as an addition to the regular 100-page service.
 November – The Ceefax service is relaunched.
 1984
 7 January – Daytime Ceefax transmissions are renamed Pages from Ceefax following the decision by Radio Times to begin listing daytime Ceefax broadcasts.
 1985
 Sky Channel launches its teletext service Sky Text.
 1 October – ORACLE revamps its service. The pages on ITV become more news focused and more regional pages are added and the content on Channel 4 becomes more magazine focussed. The changes also see the end of duplicate pages on both channels.
 1986
 2 April – The first in-vision teletext service is seen on ITV when Central launches its Jobfinder service which broadcasts for one hour after the end of the day's programming. 
 May – Ceefax expands its sports coverage when it moves the sport pages to the 300s. This allows Ceefax to expand other sections into the 20 pages previously used for sports news.
 24 October – Ahead of the launch of the BBC's daytime television service, Pages from Ceefax are shown during BBC1's daytime downtime for the final time.
 1987
 No events.
 1988
 The commencement of 24-hour broadcasting on ITV sees many regions launching a teletext Jobfinder service as part of their overnight offering with almost all of the ITV regions using Level 2 teletext graphics.
 1 December – ORACLE launches its teletext soap opera Park Avenue. A new episode is released daily until ORACLE’s final day on air. To this day, it emits the only soap opera of its kind.
 1989
 31 March – The last Oracle on View transmission takes place.
 The Ceefax Telesoftware transmissions end after six years.
 20 November – The Ceefax service is relaunched to focus on news, sport and current affairs. The magazine elements are significantly reduced and are mainly restricted to the weekend.

1990s 
 1990
 No events.
 1991
 16 October – The Independent Television Commission announces the results of the franchise round. Following the Broadcasting Act 1990 and ORACLE loses the National Teletext franchise to Teletext Ltd.
 1992
 16 November – A reorganisation of the Ceefax service takes place.
 31 December – This was ORACLE’s final day on air, and it stops broadcasting at 23:59:59.
 1993
 1 January – At the stroke of midnight, Teletext launches as ITV's new teletext service.
 1994
 February – Level 2 teletext graphics are introduced to Pages from Ceefax. However, in early 1996 the Ceefax Level 2 broadcasts are abandoned.
 1995
 16 October – BBC Learning Zone launches and Ceefax pages are broadcast in the gaps between the end of regular programmes and the start of Learning Zone broadcasts. This is the first time that Ceefax is broadcast overnight on a regular basis.
 1996
 16 November – A major (and final) reorganisation of the Ceefax service takes place.
 1997
 6 January – Channel 4 starts 24-hour broadcasting, resulting in the end of 4-Tel on View. 
 30 March – Channel 5 launches and it provides a teletext service 5 Text. Sky Text is contracted to operate the service.
 9 November – 
 Pages from Ceefax is broadcast on BBC1 for the final time as from the following day, all overnight downtime is replaced by an overnight simulcast of BBC News 24.
 The launch of BBC News 24 sees the BBC introduce a teletext service for the channel. However it is not known as Ceefax despite carrying many of the same pages.
 1998
 No events.
 1999
 No events.

2000s 
 2000
 No events.
 2001
 No events.
 2002
 Channel 4 renames its teletext service to FourText.
 Ceefax stops broadcasting on digital satellite.
 Teletext Ltd. takes over as provider of Channel 5’s teletext service.
 2003
 No events.
 2004
 No events.
2005
 No events.
 2006
 No events.
 2007
 17 October – Eskdale Green, Gosforth and Whitehaven in west Cumbria are the first places in the UK to lose their teletext services when they become the first area to complete Digital Switchover.
 2008
 20 November – Selkirk is the first major transmitter to stop broadcasting teletext services and over the next four years, teletext is switched off on a transmitter-by-transmitter basis as analogue transmissions end as the UK goes through digital switchover.
 2009
 9 November – Sbectel stops broadcasting on the day that the first area in Wales (most of South West Wales) completes Digital Switchover.
 15 December – With the exception of its travel and holiday sections, ITVs teletext service stops broadcasting on analogue TV.

2010s
2010
 29 January – The broadcasting regulator Ofcom revokes Teletext's licence to broadcast and in May Ofcom imposes a financial penalty of £225,000 on Teletext Limited for ceasing to provide part of its service whilst its licence was still extant.
2011
 Channel 5 closes its teletext service 5 Text.
2012
22 October – At 5.59am the final transmission of Pages from Ceefax comes to an end with special continuity announcements and a specially created end caption featuring various Ceefax graphics from over the years.
23 October – At 23:32:19 BST, in line with the digital switchover being completed in Northern Ireland.
2013
30 October – Sky switches off its Sky Text service.

See also
Timeline of in vision teletext broadcasts in the UK

References

teletext on UK television
teletext on UK television
Tele
Teletext
teletext on UK television